The Richard Tucker Music Foundation, founded in 1975, carries the name of Richard Tucker. The foundation is a "non-profit cultural organization dedicated to perpetuating the artistic legacy of the great American tenor through the support and advancement of the careers of talented American opera singers by bringing opera into the community. The Foundation seeks to heighten appreciation for opera by offering free performances in the New York metropolitan area and by supporting music education enrichment programs."

Through awards, grants for study, performance opportunities and other career-enhancing activities the foundation provides professional development for singers at several levels of career-readiness.

Details
The Sara Tucker Study Grant awards US$5,000 unrestricted grants to singers under the age of 27 who are selected through a vocal competition. Applicants must be recent graduates from a university or music conservatory and should be making the transition from student to professional singer. A candidate should have recently completed a graduate degree program or work in a young artist or Apprentice program at a regional company. Notable winners of this awards include: Michael Maniaci (2002), Sarah Coburn (2004), Lisette Oropesa (2007).

The Richard Tucker Career Grant awards US$10,000 unrestricted grants to singers, selected through a vocal competition, who have begun professional careers and who have already performed roles with opera companies nationally or internationally. A Career Grant candidate must be 36 years old or younger and should have a fair amount of performing experience in professional companies.
Notable winners of this awards include: June Anderson, Brian Asawa, Harolyn Blackwell, Stephanie Blythe, Christine Goerke, Susan Graham, Nathan Gunn, Jerry Hadley, John Keyes, Chris Merritt, Kelley Nassief, Stephanie Novacek, and Chad Shelton.

The Richard Tucker Award is awarded to a single performer who has "reached a high level of artistic accomplishment and who, in the opinion of a conferral panel, is on the threshold of a major international career". The Richard Tucker Award is selected by committee and not audition. This prestigious award carries not only the name of Richard Tucker and a cash prize of US$30,000 (2012, 2017–2019: US$50,000), but also a prestigious list of past recipients. The operative guideline for the Richard Tucker Award is that it be awarded to "an American singer poised on the edge of a major national and international career, and it is hoped that the award acts as a well-timed catalyst to elevate the artist's career to even greater heights." In 2012, Ailyn Pérez was named as the winner of the Richard Tucker Award, making her the first Hispanic singer to receive the award.

The Richard Tucker Music Foundation also offers programs such as master classes and concerts in a variety of community settings which provide performance opportunities for award winners and enrich the cultural life of the communities in which they take place. These concerts are frequently broadcast on the radio.

Richard Tucker Award recipients

1978 Rockwell Blake
1979 Diana Soviero
1980 Barry McCauley 
1981 J. Patrick Raftery 
1983 Susan Dunn
1984 Roger Roloff 
1985 Aprile Millo 
1986 Dolora Zajick 
1987 Harry Dworchak 
1988 Richard Leech 
1989 Margaret Jane Wray 
1990 Renée Fleming 
1991 No award given
1992 Deborah Voigt 
1993 Ruth Ann Swenson 
1994 Jennifer Larmore 
1995 Paul Groves 
1996 Dwayne Croft 
1997 David Daniels 
1998 Patricia Racette 
1999 Stephanie Blythe 
2000 Gregory Turay 
2001 Christine Goerke 
2002 Joyce DiDonato 
2003 John Relyea 
2004 Matthew Polenzani 
2005 Eric Cutler
2006 Lawrence Brownlee 
2007 Brandon Jovanovich
2008 No award given
2009 Stephen Costello
2010 James Valenti
2011 Angela Meade
2012 Ailyn Pérez
2013 Isabel Leonard
2014 Michael Fabiano
2015 Jamie Barton
2016 Tamara Wilson
2017 Nadine Sierra
2018 Christian Van Horn
2019 Lisette Oropesa
2020 No Award Given
2021 No Award Given
2022 Angel Blue

References

External links

Classical music awards
Awards established in 1975
Arts foundations based in the United States
Music organizations based in the United States
Opera competitions
1975 establishments in New York (state)